Walter Goss (July 21, 1928 – July 26, 2012) was an American sound engineer. He was nominated for an Academy Award in the category Best Sound for the film The Deep.

Selected filmography
 The Deep (1977)

References

External links

 Obituary, Las Vegas Review-Journal

1928 births
2012 deaths
American audio engineers